Santiago Gabriel Martínez Pintos (born 30 July 1991) is a Uruguayan professional footballer who plays as a central midfielder for Montevideo Wanderers.

Club career
Martínez started his senior career in 2011 with Montevideo Wanderers, making his professional debut in a 5–1 Uruguayan Primera División win against El Tanque Sisley on 3 April. He went onto make six appearances during 2010–11 prior to playing twenty-six times in 2011–12, a season in which Martínez accumulated twelve yellow cards and three red cards. He scored his first career goal in 2012–13's first match, an away win vs. Cerro Largo. In July 2014, Martínez joined Argentine Primera División side Quilmes on loan. He was sent off in his second start against Defensa y Justicia. Overall, he made six appearances.

He returned to Montevideo Wanderers in January 2015 and subsequently made eighty-three appearances and scored once in the following four seasons. On 10 July 2017, Martínez completed a loan move to Belgrano of the Argentine Primera División. He returned to Montevideo Wanderers in June 2018. His 200th career appearance arrived on 4 August versus Peñarol. After featuring twenty-four times back with his parent team, Martínez was loaned out for a third time in June 2019 as he joined Ascenso MX side Atlante.

International career
He received a Uruguay U20 call-up for the 2011 FIFA U-20 World Cup in Colombia, but was an unused substitute in all three Group B fixtures as Uruguay were eliminated at the group stages.

Career statistics
.

References

External links

1991 births
Living people
Footballers from Salto, Uruguay
Uruguayan footballers
Montevideo Wanderers F.C. players
Quilmes Atlético Club footballers
Club Atlético Belgrano footballers
Atlante F.C. footballers
Uruguayan Primera División players
Argentine Primera División players
Uruguayan expatriate footballers
Expatriate footballers in Argentina
Expatriate footballers in Mexico
Uruguayan expatriate sportspeople in Argentina
Uruguayan expatriate sportspeople in Mexico
Association football midfielders